Ayman Ashraf Elsayed Elsembeskany (born 9 April 1991) is an Egyptian footballer who plays as a centre-back, a left-back or a defensive midfielder for Egyptian Premier League side Al Ahly and the Egyptian national team.

International career
In May 2018, he was named in Egypt’s preliminary squad for the 2018 FIFA World Cup in Russia. He scored his first international goal in 25 May 2018 against Kuwait that ended in a 1–1 draw. He was also named in Egypt’s preliminary squad for the 2021 Africa Cup of Nations.

Personal life
On 16 September 2016, he lost both his mother and sister in a tragic car accident in Alexandria.

Career statistics

International
Statistics accurate as of match played 15 June 2018.

International goals
Scores and results list Egypt's goal tally first.

Honours and achievements

Club
Al Ahly
 Egyptian Premier League: 2009–10, 2010–11, 2017–18, 2018–19, 2019–20
 Egypt Cup: 2019–20
 Egyptian Super Cup: 2017–18, 2018–19
 CAF Champions League: 2019–20, 2020-21
 CAF Super Cup: 2021 (May), 2021 (December)
 FIFA Club World Cup: Third-Place 2020 FIFA Club World Cup, Third-Place 2021 FIFA Club World Cup

References

1991 births
Living people
Egyptian footballers
Egypt international footballers
Association football defenders
Al Ahly SC players
Smouha SC players
Footballers from Cairo
Egyptian Premier League players
2018 FIFA World Cup players
2019 Africa Cup of Nations players
2021 Africa Cup of Nations players